Gashani (also Romanized as Gashānī; also known as Kāshānī) is a village in Korzan Rud Rural District, in the Central District of Tuyserkan County, Hamadan Province, Iran. At the 2006 census, its population was 809, in 229 families.

References 

Populated places in Tuyserkan County